Spartan Communications, Inc. was a company that was based in Spartanburg, South Carolina that owned WSPA-TV as Spartan's flagship station from 1956 to 2000 when Spartan merged with Media General of Richmond, VA. 
In 1984, Spartan bought WBTW and KIMT-TV from the Shotts family.

Former Spartan-owned stations
Stations are arranged alphabetically by state and by city of license.

See also
 WSPA-TV (former flagship station)
 Media General, the first successor to Spartan Communications.
 Nexstar Media Group, the second successor and current owner of most of the former Spartan stations.

Spartanburg, South Carolina
Defunct broadcasting companies of the United States
Companies based in Spartanburg, South Carolina
2000 mergers and acquisitions
Nexstar Media Group